Tohmajärvi is a municipality of Finland. It is located in the North Karelia region. The municipality has a population of 
which 
is water. The population density is
. The municipality is unilingually Finnish.

Neighbouring municipalities are Joensuu, Kitee and Rääkkylä. The municipality of Värtsilä was consolidated with Tohmajärvi in 2005.

Tohmajärvi is located along the Blue Highway, which is an international tourist route from Mo i Rana, Norway to Pudozh, Russia via Sweden. The border crossing to Russia, Niirala, is in Värtsilä, now part of Tohmajärvi.

One of the most significant highways in Tohmajärvi is Highway 9, which runs west through Joensuu, Kuopio, Jyväskylä and Tampere to Turku. The Blue Highway follows this highway to Tohmajärvi.

Notable people
Katri Helena: Singer
Anna Easteden: Actress and a model
Siiri Rantanen: skier
Seppo Räty: Finnish javelin thrower
Teuvo Ihanus, Finnish composer
Maiju Lassila, Finnish author

References

External links

 Tohmajarvi.fi – Official website

 
Populated places established in 1869
1869 establishments in the Russian Empire